Janet Toro (born in Osorno, Chile, August 24, 1963) is a performance artist based in Chile and Germany whose work has centered around an anti-establishment message and the illumination of the social injustices that resulted from the Pinochet dictatorship. She is most well known for her work, El cuerpo de la memoria (The body of memory), where she performed 90 actions over 44 days at the Museo Nacional de Bellas Artes in Santiago, Chile. Shortly after this, she moved to Germany in 1999, where she continued her career as a performance artist before moving back to Chile in 2014.

Biography 

Janet Toro studied fine art at the Universidad de Chile in Santiago and was affiliated with the artist activist group, Agrupación de Plásticos Jóvenes. During the time Chile was under the military dictatorship, Toro stopped painting to pursue activist and performance art. The Chilean group, Colectivo de Acciones de Art (CADA) served as inspiration as Toro created more anti-dictatorial work. Shortly after her return to Chile in 2014, she produced the work In Situ at the Museo de la Memoria y los Derechos Humanos in Santiago. This work addressed the loss of the Mapuche culture in contemporary Chile.

Selected solo exhibition and performances 
1986 – Dos preguntas (performance with Claudia Winther), Paseo Ahumada, Santiago

1998 – La locura (performance), Centro Experimental Perrera-Arte, Santiago

2001 – Perros peleando, Galeria Gerda Türke, Dortmund, Germany

2004 – Exposición Mácula, Bonifatius Kirche, Dortmund, Germany

2011 – Entre líneas, Galeria Kunstkontor, Cologne, Germany

Gallery

References

Further reading 
Alvear, Lia. "Janet Toro: 'The Performances and the Art Transform the Society, Although It Is a Second.'" Arte al limite, October 13, 2015. https://www.arteallimite.com/en/2015/10/janet-toro-las-performances-y-el-arte-transforman-la-sociedad-aunque-sea-por-un-segundo.

Ballester Buigues, Irene. "Metáforas extremas frente al dolor y desede el feminismo". Dossiers feministes, no. 16 (2012): 11-18. "Indigenas, inmigración, deuda, y heridas inspiran performances de Janet Toro." Biobiochile, September 29, 2015. http://www.biobiochile.cl/noticias/2015/09/29/indigenas-inmigracion-deuda-y-heridas-inspiran-performances-de-janet-toro.shtml.

Toro, Janet. El cuerpo de la memoira/ The body of memory / Der Körper der Erinnerung. Cologne: Janet Toro, 2012.

Tupper, Sofia. "Janet Toro Benavides, performista: 'La realidad sigue siendo urgente.'" El Mostrador, September 28, 2015. http://www.elmostrador.cl/cultura/2015/09/28/janet-toro-benavides-performista-la-realidad-sigue-siendo-urgente.

External Links 
Colectivo de Acciones de Arte 

1963 births
Living people
20th-century Chilean women artists
21st-century Chilean women artists
Chilean performance artists
University of Chile alumni
People from Osorno, Chile